Allen Gum (born July 22, 1969) is a former American baseball coach and player. He played college baseball at Crowder College from 1988 to 1989 before transferring to Southern Arkansas. He then served as the head coach of the Southern Arkansas Muleriders (2006–2010) and the Central Arkansas Bears (2011–2021).

Pre-collegiate coaching
Gum played two seasons at Crowder College before completing his eligibility at Southern Arkansas. Both seasons with the Muleriders, he batted above .300 and helped lead the team to conference championships. In his junior season, Southern Arkansas reached the NAIA World Series, where Gum was awarded the Charles Berry Hustle Award. He then served as an assistant coach at Sheridan High School in Sheridan, Arkansas for six years before becoming head coach at Batesville High School in Batesville, Arkansas in 2000. He remained at Batesville through the 2003 season, compiling a record of 75–25, and finishing as state runners up in both 2002 and 2003.

Collegiate coaching career
In 2004, Gum became an assistant at Southern Arkansas. He was elevated to the top job in 2006. In five seasons, the Muleriders won 40 or more games every year, reached the Division II College World Seriesin 2009, won two conference championships, four Regionals, and the number one national ranking for 24 weeks during the course of three seasons. In the 2010 MLB Draft, Muleriders pitcher Hayden Simpson was picked 16th overall by the Chicago Cubs, the highest Division II players to be drafted that year. In July 2010, Gum became head coach at Central Arkansas. He led the Bears to their first Southland Conference baseball tournament title in 2013, and reached the Regional final before falling to eventual national runner-up Mississippi State. Gum announced that the 2021 season would be his last at Central Arkansas, retiring from coaching.

Head coaching record

References

External links
Allen Gum 2020 Coaching Staff - University of Central Arkansas

Living people
1969 births
Central Arkansas Bears baseball coaches
Crowder Roughriders baseball players
High school baseball coaches in the United States
Southern Arkansas Muleriders baseball coaches
Southern Arkansas Muleriders baseball players